UFC on ESPN: Blaydes vs. Daukaus (also known as UFC on ESPN 33) was a mixed martial arts event produced by the Ultimate Fighting Championship that took place on March 26, 2022 at the Nationwide Arena in Columbus, Ohio, United States.

Background
A light heavyweight bout between former KSW and UFC Light Heavyweight Champion Jan Błachowicz and Aleksandar Rakić was expected to serve as the event headliner. However in late January, Błachowicz withdrew due to an injury and the bout was rescheduled for UFC on ESPN 36. Instead, a heavyweight bout between Curtis Blaydes and Chris Daukaus headlined the event.

A women's flyweight bout between Joanne Wood and Alexa Grasso was originally scheduled for UFC Fight Night: Vieira vs. Tate, but Grasso pulled out due to injury and the pairing was scrapped. They were then rescheduled for this event.

A welterweight bout between Matt Brown and Bryan Barberena was expected to take place at UFC on ESPN: Font vs. Aldo in last December, but Brown was removed from the contest due to testing positive for COVID-19. They instead met at this event.

A bantamweight bout between Montel Jackson and Danaa Batgerel was scheduled for this event. However, Jackson had to pull out of the bout and was replaced by Chris Gutiérrez.

A women's strawweight bout between former Invicta FC Atomweight Champion Michelle Waterson and Amanda Ribas was expected to take place at this event. However, Waterson was forced to withdraw in early March due to an undisclosed injury and the bout was postponed to UFC 274. At first, they were expected to meet at UFC 257, but Waterson pulled out of that bout due to undisclosed reasons.

Lerone Murphy and Nate Landwehr were expected to meet in a featherweight bout. However, Murphy withdrew from the bout due to undisclosed reasons and was replaced by David Onama. In turn, Landwehr had to pull out of the bout and the bout was scrapped.

Undefeated middleweights Aliaskhab Khizriev and Abusupiyan Magomedov were expected to meet at the event. However, Magomedov pulled out due to unknown reasons and was replaced by Denis Tiuliulin.

A featherweight bout between Tucker Lutz and Seung Woo Choi was scheduled for the event. However, Choi was forced to withraw from the event due to an undisclosed injury and the bout was scrapped.

A heavyweight bout between Aleksei Oleinik and Ilir Latifi was expected to take place at event. However, the bout was canceled as Latifi withdrew on the day of the event due to illness. The pairing was rescheduled for two weeks later at UFC 273.

Results

Bonus awards 
The following fighters received $50,000 bonuses.
 Fight of the Night: Bryan Barberena vs. Matt Brown
 Performance of the Night: Curtis Blaydes and Chris Gutiérrez

Records set
The event had the highest grossing gate for a U.S.-based fight night.

Reported payout 
The following is the reported payout to the fighters as reported to the Ohio Athletic Commission. It is important to note the amounts do not include sponsor money, discretionary bonuses, viewership points or additional earnings. The total disclosed payout for the event was $1,717,000.

 Curtis Blaydes: $262,000 (includes $131,000 win bonus) def. Chris Daukaus: $80,000
 Alexa Grasso: $86,000 (includes $43,000 win bonus) def. Joanne Wood: $70,000
 Kai Kara-France: $102,000 (includes $51,000 win bonus) def. Askar Askarov: $26,000
 Bryan Barberena: $122,000 (includes $61,000 win bonus) def. Matt Brown: $105,000
 Manon Fiorot: $80,000 (includes $40,000 win bonus) def. Jennifer Maia: $60,000
 Neil Magny: $230,000 (includes $115,000 win bonus) def. Max Griffin: $53,000
 Marc Diakiese: $66,000 (includes $33,000 win bonus) def. Viachaslav Borshchev: $12,000
 Sara McMann: $88,000 (includes $44,000 win bonus) def. Karol Rosa: $28,000
 Chris Gutiérrez: $72,000 (includes $36,000 win bonus) def. Batgerel Danaa: $28,000
 Matheus Nicolau: $44,000 (includes $22,000 win bonus) def. David Dvořák: $35,000
 Aliaskhab Khizriev: $20,000 (includes $10,000 win bonus) def. Denis Tiuliulin: $12,000
 Luis Saldaña: $24,000 (includes $12,000 win bonus) def. Bruno Souza: $12,000

See also 

 List of UFC events
 List of current UFC fighters
 2022 in UFC

References 

UFC on ESPN
2022 in mixed martial arts
March 2022 sports events in the United States
Mixed martial arts in Ohio
Sports competitions in Columbus, Ohio
2022 in sports in Ohio
Events in Columbus, Ohio